Giocattolo Motori Pty Ltd was a short-lived Australian car company, founded in 1986 by sports car enthusiast Paul Halstead and Formula One designer Barry Lock.  The company's name comes from the Italian word for "toy".

The Giocattolo was originally based on a heavily modified Alfa Romeo Sprint body shell with a mid-mounted Alfa V6 engine. By the fourth prototype, the V6 engine had proved to be too difficult and expensive to import and install in the car, so the company replaced the projected V6 by a Holden V8 engine built by Holden Special Vehicles. It is unknown what happened to the factory Sprint engines and gearboxes that were taken from the cars.

Including the Alfa-powered third prototype (which was rebuilt and re-fitted with the Holden V8 after an accident with a police car almost destroyed the vehicle), just fifteen Giocattolos were built before the company folded in 1989.  Thirteen of the fifteen cars are believed to still be in existence and one is unaccounted for. The other - Build No. 007 - was infamously destroyed in a fiery high-speed crash at Eastern Creek Raceway in February 2001, killing the driver, 29-year-old Todd Wilkes.

The third prototype appeared on the TV show Beyond 2000.

References

External links
Giocattolo History Site

Car manufacturers of Australia
Defunct motor vehicle manufacturers of Australia
Sports car manufacturers